Noke Wangnao popularly known as Noke is a politician from Nagaland, India. He was elected to Nagaland Legislative Assembly 8 times from Tapi Assembly constituency in 1974, 1977, 1982, 1987, 1989, 2003, 2013 and 2018 Nagaland Legislative Assembly election. He has earlier served as a minister in Nagaland Legislative Assembly and is currently serving as an advisor to Chief Minister of Nagaland.

References 

1948 births
Living people
Naga people
Nagaland MLAs 2003–2008
Nagaland MLAs 2013–2018
Nagaland MLAs 2018–2023
Nagaland MLAs 1974–1975
Nagaland MLAs 1977–1982
Nagaland MLAs 1982–1987
Nagaland MLAs 1987–1988
Nagaland MLAs 1989–1992
People from Mon district
Naga People's Front politicians